for more in depth information about the magazine see Black Mask (magazine)
The Casey franchise was started in 1934 by George Harmon Coxe in Black Mask (magazine).   A total of 22 stories were published in the magazine, plus two serialized novels. 
Note the company these stories keep within the pages of Black Mask such as Raymond Chandler & E. Stanley Gardner. This magazine was an important part of the pulp magazine genre.

In addition to these stories, the two earliest novels were serialized over three issues each.

Notes

External links
BlackMaskMagazine.com
History of Black Mask

Characters in pulp fiction
Defunct literary magazines published in the United States
Lists of stories
Works originally published in Black Mask (magazine)